The Men's Javelin Throw F11-12 had its Final held on 10 September at 17:25.

Medalists

Results

References
Final

Athletics at the 2008 Summer Paralympics